Kensington Plantation House is a historic plantation house located near Eastover, Richland County, South Carolina. It was built between 1851 and 1853, by Colonel Richard Singleton, a brother of Angelica Singleton Van Buren, daughter-in-law of President Martin Van Buren. The wood frame dwelling consists of a -story, central section with a Second Empire style copper covered dome, flanked by lower wings with arched colonnades. The front entrance features a porte-cochere with Corinthian order arches and pilasters.

It was added to the National Register of Historic Places in 1971.

See also

References

External links

Plantation houses in South Carolina
Historic American Buildings Survey in South Carolina
Houses on the National Register of Historic Places in South Carolina
Second Empire architecture in South Carolina
Houses completed in 1853
Houses in Richland County, South Carolina
National Register of Historic Places in Richland County, South Carolina